Pyhäselkä is a former municipality of Finland, now part of Joensuu. It seat was located in Hammaslahti.

Pyhäselkä is located in the province of Eastern Finland and is part of the North Karelia region. The municipality had a population of 7,390 (2003) and covered an area of 351.58 km² of which 71.38 km² is water. The population density was 26.4 inhabitants per km².

The municipality was unilingually Finnish.

Pyhäselkä was consolidated, together with Eno, with Joensuu on January 1, 2009.

External links 

Populated places disestablished in 2009
2009 disestablishments in Finland
Former municipalities of Finland
Joensuu